Omar Antonio Morales Ferrer (born October 17, 1985) is a Venezuelan mixed martial artist who competes in the Featherweight and Lightweight divisions of the Ultimate Fighting Championship.

Mixed martial arts career

Early career
Starting his career in 2011, Morales compiled a 7–0 record, fighting mainly for various regional Venezuelan promotions and picking up a knockout win at Bellator 204. Morales moved to United States in order to pursuit his career in mixed martial arts in 2015.

Dana White's Contender Series
Morales was eventually invited to Dana White's Contender Series 23, where he faced the then Legacy Fighting Alliance Lightweight champ, Harvey Park, for a UFC contract. he finished the fight with the use of leg kicks and eventually winning by TKO, earning himself a chance into the UFC.

Ultimate Fighting Championship
Morales made his promotional debut facing Dong Hyun Ma on December 21, 2019 at UFC on ESPN+ 23. He won the fight by unanimous decision.

Next Morales faced Gabriel Benítez on May 13, 2020 at UFC Fight Night: Smith vs. Teixeira. He won the fight via unanimous decision.

Morales then faced Giga Chikadze on  October 11, 2020 at UFC Fight Night: Moraes vs. Sandhagen. He lost the fight by unanimous decision.

Morales faced Shane Young on March 27, 2021 at UFC 260. He won the fight via unanimous decision.

Morales faced Jonathan Pearce on September 25, 2021 at UFC 266.  He lost the fight via rear-naked choke in round two.

Morales faced Uroš Medić on May 21, 2022 at UFC Fight Night 206. He lost the fight via technical knockout in round two.

Morales was scheduled to face Mateusz Rębecki on January 14, 2023, at UFC Fight Night 217. However, Morales withdrew the fight for Undisclosed reasons.

Morales faced Chris Duncan, replacing Michal Figlak, on March 18, 2023, at UFC 286. He lost the fight via split decision.

Mixed martial arts record

|-
|Loss
|align=center|11–4
|Chris Duncan
|Decision (split)
|UFC 286
|
|align=center|3
|align=center|5:00
|London, England
|
|-
|Loss
|align=center|11–3
|Uroš Medić
|TKO (punches)
|UFC Fight Night: Holm vs. Vieira
|
|align=center|2
|align=center|3:05
|Las Vegas, Nevada, United States
|
|-
|Loss
|align=center|11–2
|Jonathan Pearce
|Submission (rear-naked choke)
|UFC 266
|
|align=center|2
|align=center|3:31
|Las Vegas, Nevada, United States
|
|-
|Win
|align=center|11–1
|Shane Young
|Decision (unanimous)
|UFC 260 
|
|align=center|3
|align=center|5:00
|Las Vegas, Nevada, United States
|
|-
|Loss
|align=center|10–1
|Giga Chikadze
|Decision (unanimous)
|UFC Fight Night: Moraes vs. Sandhagen
|
|align=center|3
|align=center|5:00
|Abu Dhabi, United Arab Emirates
|
|-
| Win
| align=center|10–0
| Gabriel Benítez
|Decision (unanimous)
|UFC Fight Night: Smith vs. Teixeira
|
|align=center|3
|align=center|5:00
|Jacksonville, Florida, United States
|
|-
| Win
| align=center|9–0
| Ma Dong-hyun
|Decision (unanimous)
|UFC Fight Night: Edgar vs. The Korean Zombie 
|
|align=center|3
|align=center|5:00
|Busan, South Korea
|
|-
| Win
| align=center|8–0
| Harvey Park
| TKO (leg kicks and punches)
| Dana White's Contender Series 23
| 
| align=center| 2
| align=center| 1:06
| Las Vegas, Nevada, United States
|
|-
| Win
| align=center| 7–0
| Troy Nawrocki
| KO (punches)
|Bellator 204
|
|align=center|1
|align=center|0:58
|Sioux Falls, South Dakota, United States
| 
|-
| Win
| align=center| 6–0
| Jhan Zuniga
| Submission (rear-naked choke)
| Latin American Championship
|
|align=Center|1
|align=center|3:14
|Valencia, Venezuela
| 
|-
| Win
| align=center| 5–0
| Danilo Padilha da Silva
| Decision (unanimous)
| Fight Time 25
| 
| align=center| 3
| align=center| 5:00
| Miami, Florida, United States
| 
|-
| Win
| align=center| 4–0
| Stefan Werleman
| Submission (rear-naked choke)
| Eye 4N Eye Fighting Championships
| 
| align=center| 1
| align=center| 0:49
| Oranjestad, Aruba
| 
|-
| Win
| align=center| 3–0
| Wilmer Gonzalez
| Submission (guillotine choke)
| Supremacia MMA 2
| 
| align=center| 1
| align=center| 1:54
| Caracas, Venezuela
| 
|-
| Win
| align=center| 2–0
| Jesus Rodriguez
| Submission (armbar)
| Pugilatus MMA
| 
| align=center| 1
| align=center| 3:34
| Los Teques, Venezuela
|
|-
| Win
| align=center| 1–0
| Angel Brito
| Submission
| GOV 2
| 
| align=center| 1
| align=center| N/A
| Maturín, Venezuela
|

See also 
 List of current UFC fighters
 List of male mixed martial artists

References

External links 
  
 

Living people
1985 births
Venezuelan male mixed martial artists
Sportspeople from Caracas
Featherweight mixed martial artists
Lightweight mixed martial artists
Ultimate Fighting Championship male fighters